Henry Joseph Mansell (born October 10, 1937) is an American prelate of the Roman Catholic Church. He served as archbishop of the Archdiocese of Hartford in Connecticut from the fourth Archbishop of Hartford from 2004 to 2013.

Mansell previously served as bishop of the Diocese of Buffalo in New York from 1995 to 2003 and as an auxiliary bishop of the Archdiocese of New York in New York City from 1992 to 1995.

Biography

Early life 
Henry Mansell was born on October 10, 1937, in the Bronx section of New York City to Henry and Bridget (née Finn) Mansell, and baptized at St. Augustine's Church in the Bronx three weeks later. He has a sister, Ann. Mansell attended Cathedral College in Manhattan from 1951 to 195.  He then entered St. Joseph's Seminary in Yonkers, New York, earning a Bachelor's degree in 1959.

Priesthood 
Mansell was ordained to the priesthood in Rome for the Archdiocese of New York by  Archbishop Martin O'Connor on December 19, 1962. He earned a Licentiate of Sacred Theology from the Pontifical Gregorian University in Rome in 1963, and did postgraduate work at the Catholic University of America in Washington, D.C. until 1965.

Mansell served as a parish priest at parishes in Harrison, New York, the Bronx, and Saints John and Paul Parish in Larchmont, New York. He was appointed director of the Office of Parish Councils on June 9, 1972, and vice chancellor of the archdiocese on July 1, 1985. On March 17, 1986, Mansell was raised by the Vatican to the rank of honorary prelate. He later became director of priest personnel and chancellor (1988) of the archdiocese.

Auxiliary Bishop of New York 
On November 24, 1992, Mansell was appointed as an auxiliary bishop of  the Archdiocese of New York and titular bishop of Marazanae by Pope John Paul II. He received his episcopal consecration on January 6, 1993 from the pope, with Archbishops Giovanni Re and Justin Rigali serving as co-consecrators, in Rome. He selected as his episcopal motto, "Blessed be God".

Bishop of Buffalo
John Paul II appointed Mansell as the twelfth bishop of the Diocese of Buffalo on April 18, 1995. Succeeding the retiring Bishop Edward D. Head, Mansell was installed on June 12, 1995, at St. Joseph's Cathedral in Buffalo.

During his tenure, Mansell visited every parish in the diocese, most of them multiple times. He also promoted Catholic education, and health care and social service institutes within the diocese. Mansell established the Catholic Health Care System of Western New York, uniting the resources of local Catholic hospitals, nursing homes, and other health care facilities. In 1996, Mansell instituted the diocese's vicariate structure, and in 1997 he led the diocese in celebrating its 150th anniversary. He instituted a televised "Daily Mass" celebrated from a chapel at St. Joseph Cathedral for the homebound.

Mansell received honorary doctorates from Niagara University in Lewiston, New York in May 1996, from St. Bonaventure University in Saint Bonaventure, New York in August 1996, and from Canisius College in Buffalo in May 1997. In September 2003, New York Governor George Pataki named Mansell to the State Commission on Education Reform.

In Mansell's farewell letter to parishioners of the dioceses in 2003, he said that, "Buffalo is a very strong diocese," and that its parishes, schools, and social service agencies "guarantee strength...for years to come." In 2006, Buffalo Business First reported that Mansell's successor, Bishop Edward Kmiec said that some statistics were too optimistic, and that church and parochial school closures would be necessary to address declining attendance and enrollment, as well as $3 million in debt.

Archbishop of Hartford
Pope John Paul II appointed Mansell as the fourth archbishop of the Archdiocese of Hartford on October 20, 2003. He was installed on December 18, 2004. On June 29, 2004, Mansell received the pallium from Pope John Paul II in Rome.

In 2005, the archdiocese paid $22 million to settle sexual abuse claims brought by 43 people against 14 priests, the majority of cases occurring in the 1960s and 1970s. Mansell made a statement regarding the settlement. Of the settlement of the sexual abuse case regarding the 14 priests in the Archdiocese, Mansell was quoted in a New York Times article by William Yardley, stating: "[It is] part of a healing process for the persons whose lives have been severely harmed by the evil of sexual abuse and for the Church itself."

Mansell is a proponent of the Traditional Latin Mass.

Retirement 
Having reached the mandatory retirement age, Mansell submitted his letter of resignation as Archbishop of the Archdiocese of Hartford to Pope Francis.  Mansell was succeeded by Bishop Leonard P. Blair in December 2013.

See also

 Catholic Church in the United States
 Historical list of the Catholic bishops of the United States
 List of Catholic bishops of the United States
 Lists of patriarchs, archbishops, and bishops

References

External links

 Roman Catholic Archdiocese of Hartford
 Roman Catholic Diocese of Buffalo

Episcopal succession

1937 births
Living people
Saint Joseph's Seminary (Dunwoodie) alumni
Catholic University of America alumni
Roman Catholic bishops of Hartford
Roman Catholic bishops of Buffalo
American Roman Catholic archbishops